Vepada is a village in Vizianagaram district of the Indian state of Andhra Pradesh, India.

Demography
Vepada mandal has a population of 50,264 in 2001. 24,823 Males and 25,441 Females. The average literacy rate is 48%, below the national average of 59.5%. Male literacy rate is 61% and that of females 35%.

References 

Villages in Vizianagaram district
Mandal headquarters in Vizianagaram district